Gene Trautmann (born 1966) is a former drummer for Queens of the Stone Age, Eagles of Death Metal, Dig, and the Miracle Workers.

Biography 

Born and raised in Portland, Oregon, Trautmann started playing along to records when he was 11 or 12. “The KISS Halloween special was sort of like that moment of clarity that told me I wanted to be involved and I had to do this for a living,” he says. He began playing in punk bands in high school and eventually joined a group called The Miracle Workers, who were dedicated to reviving the first-generation punk of mid-’60s garage bands like The Sonics and the Count Five. After graduating in 1985 from Oregon Episcopal School, he followed the band to Los Angeles and played with it on several albums, in addition to touring the U.S. and Europe. Trautmann was also briefly a member of the band Dig from 1997 to 1999, playing on their third album, 1999's Life Like. They disbanded later that same year.

After Brant Bjork left Kyuss, Trautmann auditioned to be drummer. He played with the group for two weeks before the gig eventually went to Alfredo Hernández. Trautmann then played on four tracks on Rated R and on two tracks on Songs for the Deaf, the second and third albums by Josh Homme's post-Kyuss band, Queens of the Stone Age. Trautmann was also a member of the band's touring group from June 1999 until September 2001.

Trautmann was a touring member of Eagles of Death Metal from 2006 to 2008.

References

1966 births
Living people
American rock drummers
Queens of the Stone Age members
20th-century American drummers
American male drummers
Eagles of Death Metal members
Oregon Episcopal School alumni